Pontoosuc Township is one of twenty-four townships in Hancock County, Illinois, USA.  As of the 2010 census, its population was 413 and it contained 227 housing units.

Geography

Cities, towns, villages
 Dallas City (partial)
 Pontoosuc

Cemeteries
The township contains these four cemeteries: Little Family, Myers, Pontoosuc and Tull.

Major highways
  Illinois Route 9

Airports and landing strips
 Rhea RLA Airport

Demographics

School districts
 Nauvoo-Colusa Community Unit School District 325

Political districts
 Illinois's 18th congressional district
 State House District 94
 State Senate District 47

References
 United States Census Bureau 2008 TIGER/Line Shapefiles
 
 United States National Atlas

External links
 City-Data.com
 Illinois State Archives
 Township Officials of Illinois

Townships in Hancock County, Illinois
Townships in Illinois